Aya Samaha, is an Egyptian actress. She is best known for the roles in the Egyptian web series Paranormal, Grand Hotel and film Hepta: The Last Lecture.

Personal life
She is engaged to film producer Mohamed El Sea-Bay.

Career
In 2016, she started acting with the film Hepta: The Last Lecture directed by Hadi El Bagoury. She played a minor role as the 'Girl Speaking At The Lecture'. However, she then received a role in the Egyptian mystery drama serial Grand Hotel in 2016, where she features in all 30 episodes.

In 2020, she starred in the Egyptian web series Paranormal which was based on the supernatural book series Ma Waraa Al Tabiaa written by Ahmed Khaled Tawfik. In the series, she played a supportive role of 'Huwaida Abdel Moniem'. The series was released on 5 November 2020 on Netflix, becoming Netflix's first Egyptian Original.

Filmography

References

External links
 

Living people
Egyptian film actresses
Egyptian television actresses
1992 births